The 26th Infantry Battalion "Neagoe Basarab", also known as the Red Scorpions, is an infantry battalion of the Romanian Land Forces based in Craiova. It is part of Romania's Multinational Brigade South-East. The battalion has participated in missions in Angola, Bosnia and Herzegovina, Kosovo, Iraq and Afghanistan. Its tasks there were building refugee camps and weapons depots or guarding airports, military bases and roads. The 26th Infantry Battalion got its nickname, "Red Scorpions", from allied troops of the United States in 1996 during its mission in Angola, as they encountered many scorpions there.

One of its commandants was Nicolae Ciucă, who later served as Chief of the Romanian General Staff, Minister of National Defence of Romania, Prime Minister of Romania and president of the National Liberal Party. Ciucă led the 26th Infantry Battalion during Operation Ancient Babylon in Nasiriyah in May 2004 during the Iraq War. It is reported that this military engagement was the first where the Romanian Armed Forces were "active combatants" ever since the end of World War II.

See also
 Neagoe Basarab, a Wallachian prince

References

Battalions of Romania